The Sherman Theatre is a venue in the Cathays district of Cardiff. It was built as a twin-auditorium venue in 1973 with financial support from Cardiff University. Sherman Cymru was the name of the Sherman Theatre between 2007 and 2016 when the name changed back to Sherman Theatre.

The theatre is named after Harry Sherman, the co-founder of Sherman's Football Pools, who financed its construction.

Within the premises are two performance spaces: the main auditorium with 452 seats, and the studio / arena which seats 100. The Sherman Theatre Company and Sgript Cymru merged in April 2007 to form a new company, called Sherman Cymru, based at the Sherman Theatre.

Between 1990 and 2006 the Artistic Director of the Sherman was Phil Clark. Between 1993 and 97 a number of plays were filmed for television by HTV under the series title The Sherman Plays. The current Artistic Director of the theatre is Joe Murphy.

The Sherman won the UK Theatre Award for "Best New Play 2015", for Gary Owen's Iphigenia in Splott. Sophie Melville's performance in this production received The Stage Award for Acting Excellence at the Edinburgh Fringe Festival in 2015.  The production transferred to the UK National Theatre's Temporary Theatre in January 2015, making this the first Welsh play to transfer straight to the National Theatre. Iphigenia in Splott then went on to win the James Tait Black Memorial Prize for Drama in 2016.

Gary Owen and Rachel O'Riordan’s next collaboration, Killology, won the award for Outstanding Achievement at an Affiliate Theatre at the Olivier Awards in 2018.

The Sherman won the Edinburgh Fringe First award and a Herald Angel Award in 2008 for their touring play Deep Cut, which dramatised the real-life deaths of four trainees at Deepcut Army Barracks.

The theatre was originally designed by Alex Gordon and Partners in the same dark brown brick as the Cardiff University Students' Union building next door, and was completed in 1973. It was modernised and refurbished in 2010–12 by Jonathan Adams, internally reorganised and with a distinctive new metal-clad facade.

Sherman Theatre won Regional Theatre of the Year Award at The Stage Awards 2018.

References

Further reading

External links

 85 Reviews of Productions at the Sherman Theatre: http://www.theatre-wales.co.uk/reviews/reviews_details.asp?reviewID=5127

Cathays
Theatres in Cardiff